Video Anthology Vol. 1 is an album of Nas' music videos in DVD format. Its songs are presented in a slightly altered chronological order and feature songs from all of his first six albums. It was released when the Illmatic: 10th Anniversary Platinum Edition was released to commemorate the last 10 years of Nas' career. It also features four music videos from Illmatic, a disproportionately higher amount than any other album. Nas provides commentary for all of the videos, except "The World Is Yours".

Track listing
 "It Ain't Hard To Tell"
Director: Ralph McDaniels
 "One Love"
Director: Fab Five Freddy
 "Halftime"
 "Nas Is Like"
Director: Nick Quested
Guest Appearance: DJ Premier and Ron Artest
 "The World Is Yours"
Director: Josh Taft
Guest Appearance: Pete Rock
 "If I Ruled The World (Imagine That)"
Director: Hype Williams
Guest Appearance: Big Noyd, Cormega, Mobb Deep, Lauryn Hill & Prodigy
 "Hate Me Now"
Director: Hype Williams 
Guest Appearance: P. Diddy & Jungle
Film Editing: Harvey White
 "Street Dreams"
Director: Hype Williams
Guest Appearance: Kenya Moore & Frank Vincent
Video Production: Martine Capalbo
Cinematography: Malik Hassan Sayeed
 "Nastradamus"
Director: Jeffrey W. Byrd
 "You Owe Me"
Director: Dave Meyers
Guest Appearance: Ginuwine and Destiny's Child
 "Got Ur Self A..."
Director: Benny Boom
 "One Mic"
Director: Chris Robinson
 "Made You Look"
Director: Benny Boom
Guest Appearance: Jadakiss, DJ Kay Slay, Lord Jamar & Fat Joe
 "I Can"
Director: Chris Robinson

Nas video albums
2004 video albums
Columbia Records video albums
Music video compilation albums